Māhia Peninsula (Maori:  or ) is located on the east coast of New Zealand's North Island, in the Hawke's Bay region, between the towns of Wairoa and Gisborne.

Rocket Lab has set up its Launch Complex 1 close to Ahuriri Point at the southern tip of the peninsula to launch its Electron rocket. Since 2018, it has been used as a commercial launcher of small satellites in the range of 135–235 kg, and miniature satellites called CubeSats. New Zealand's first orbital space launch took place from Launch Complex 1 on 21 January 2018.

Geography
The peninsula was once an island, but now a tombolo joins it to the North Island.

Demographics
Māhia Beach, which is on the northeast coast of the peninsula, is described by Statistics New Zealand as a rural settlement. It is part of the wider Mahia statistical area.

Māhia Beach had a population of 183 at the 2018 New Zealand census, a decrease of 3 people (−1.6%) since the 2013 census, and a decrease of 57 people (−23.8%) since the 2006 census. There were 93 households, comprising 81 males and 99 females, giving a sex ratio of 0.82 males per female. The median age was 60.1 years (compared with 37.4 years nationally), with 21 people (11.5%) aged under 15 years, 12 (6.6%) aged 15 to 29, 84 (45.9%) aged 30 to 64, and 60 (32.8%) aged 65 or older.

Ethnicities were 68.9% European/Pākehā, 37.7% Māori, 1.6% Pacific peoples, and 1.6% Asian. People may identify with more than one ethnicity.

Although some people chose not to answer the census's question about religious affiliation, 36.1% had no religion, 50.8% were Christian, and 6.6% had Māori religious beliefs.

Of those at least 15 years old, 18 (11.1%) people had a bachelor's or higher degree, and 33 (20.4%) people had no formal qualifications. The median income was $24,900, compared with $31,800 nationally. 24 people (14.8%) earned over $70,000 compared to 17.2% nationally. The employment status of those at least 15 was that 48 (29.6%) people were employed full-time, 27 (16.7%) were part-time, and 3 (1.9%) were unemployed.

Mahia statistical area
The peninsula itself covers  

Mahia had a population of 1,119 at the 2018 New Zealand census, an increase of 15 people (1.4%) since the 2013 census, and a decrease of 153 people (−12.0%) since the 2006 census. There were 456 households, comprising 552 males and 567 females, giving a sex ratio of 0.97 males per female. The median age was 49.0 years (compared with 37.4 years nationally), with 210 people (18.8%) aged under 15 years, 159 (14.2%) aged 15 to 29, 498 (44.5%) aged 30 to 64, and 252 (22.5%) aged 65 or older.

Ethnicities were 48.8% European/Pākehā, 64.9% Māori, 1.1% Pacific peoples, 0.8% Asian, and 1.3% other ethnicities. People may identify with more than one ethnicity.

The percentage of people born overseas was 4.8, compared with 27.1% nationally.

Although some people chose not to answer the census's question about religious affiliation, 35.4% had no religion, 49.3% were Christian, 8.3% had Māori religious beliefs and 0.8% had other religions.

Of those at least 15 years old, 126 (13.9%) people had a bachelor's or higher degree, and 207 (22.8%) people had no formal qualifications. The median income was $21,400, compared with $31,800 nationally. 78 people (8.6%) earned over $70,000 compared to 17.2% nationally. The employment status of those at least 15 was that 339 (37.3%) people were employed full-time, 150 (16.5%) were part-time, and 72 (7.9%) were unemployed.

History and culture

Māori history
In Maori legend, Whatonga, who came to New Zealand in search of his grandfather Toi, settled at Mahia.

The peninsula is the tribal area of the Ngāti Rongomaiwahine iwi. The word māhia means "indistinct sound" or "scrofulous swelling".
The name "Te Māhia" comes from "Te Māhia-mai-tawhiti" (the sound heard from a distance).

Portland Island, also called Waikawa, is a small island off the southern tip of Mahia Peninsula. It was named Waikawa by Kahungunu when he visited there to look for fresh drinking water and only found salt water – Waikawa means "sour water". Portland Island has an unmanned lighthouse.

European history
Shore whaling was briefly important on the Mahia Peninsula. Early whalers had a whaling station on the farm "Kini Kini", sheltered by "Long Point" on the west coast of the peninsula. The peninsula community these days is still generally a mix of Maori and European. 

Prime Minister Jacinda Ardern was proposed to by her partner, Clarke Gayford, on Mokotahi Hill.

Marae
There are four marae in the Mahia area affiliated with the hapū of the Ngāti Kahungunu iwi:

 The Kaiuku or Oku-ra-renga Marae and its Kiwi meeting house are affiliated with the hapū of Ngāti Tama, Ngāi Tū and Rongomaiwahine.
 Te Rākatō Marae is affiliated with the hapū of Ngāi Rākatō.
 Tuahuru Marae and its Hine te Rongo meeting house are affiliated with the hapū of Ngāti Tama, Ngāi Tū and Rongomaiwahine.
 Ruawharo Marae is also affiliated with Ngāti Tama and Rongomaiwahine.

In October 2020, the Government committed $1,949,075 from the Provincial Growth Fund to upgrade 24 Ngāti Kahungunu marae, including both Kaiuku and Ruawharo Marae, creating 164 jobs.  It also committed $102,644 to upgrading Tuahuru Marae, creating 4 jobs.

Economy

Sheep and cattle farms are an important part for the local community, but tourism is now the peninsula's main industry. Mahia's population swells greatly during the warmer months and in particular during school holidays.

Mahia is well known for its surf, scuba diving, hiking, and fishing. Morere Hot Springs is 15 minutes away, towards Gisborne.  The area is a popular school holiday destination and contains a holiday park dating back to the 1960s.  The remaining settlement consists mostly of holiday houses and baches.

From 2007 to 2010 Mahia became known for the presence of Moko, a dolphin.

The peninsula is the location of the Rocket Labs launch facility, which has been used to launch spy satellites for the United States of America.

Education
Te Mahia School is a year 1–8 co-educational state primary school.

References 

 
Wairoa District
Landforms of the Hawke's Bay Region
Populated places in the Hawke's Bay Region
Peninsulas of New Zealand
Surfing locations in New Zealand
Ngāti Rongomaiwahine
Populated places around Hawke Bay